Dual specificity protein kinase CLK3 is an enzyme that in humans is encoded by the CLK3 gene.
The CLK3 gene encodes a serine/threonine type protein kinase with a non-conserved N-terminal domain. A long and short isoform (phclk3 and pclk3/152) result from alternative splicing and coexist in different tissues. Isoform phclk3/152 lacks the kinase domain.

References

Further reading

External links